Road Salt One is the seventh studio album by Swedish band Pain of Salvation, released 17 May 2010 on InsideOut.  While a concept album in keeping with all previous Pain of Salvation albums, the album was more song-oriented and streamlined in its production values.

Outline

Daniel Gildenlöw has described the album in interviews as sounding more "jam oriented" with tracks that sound like they have been "recorded live in the rehearsal room".  He indicated that the intent of the album was to go "back to letting the song be the focal point" by having the album feature "just us. Playing a song meant to touch your heart. Stripped down. Naked. Brave. Old school".

Gildenlöw described the concept of Road Salt One as being many parallel stories:

Gildenlöw has also compared the album's plot to the film Magnolia in interviews.

Around the inside lips of the back cover is the following sentence: "This album, however, is NOT a part of The Perfect Element concept...but for what it's worth, it easily COULD have been, right? Right?"

Track listing 
Concept, music and lyrics by Daniel Gildenlöw.

Standard Edition

Limited Edition Digipack
"What She Means to Me" (Bonus track) - 0:50
"No Way" (Extended version) - 7:09
"She Likes to Hide" - 2:57
"Sisters" - 6:15
"Of Dust" - 2:32
"Tell Me You Don't Know" - 2:42
"Sleeping Under the Stars" - 3:37
"Darkness of Mine" - 4:15
"Linoleum" - 4:55
"Curiosity" - 3:33
"Where It Hurts" - 4:51
"Road Salt" (Extended version) - 4:40
"Innocence" - 7:13

The Japanese edition has a bonus track after "Innocence" titled "Tip Toe Two". The drum parts in the song are played by Daniel Gildenlöw.

Personnel
Daniel Gildenlöw - lead vocals, backing vocals, electric and acoustic and fretless guitars, bass guitar (tracks 2-11), organs, piano, mandolin, lute, balalaika, drums (tracks 2-6), keyboards
Johan Hallgren - electric guitars (tracks 1, 3, 7-10, and 12), backing vocals
Fredrik Hermansson - electric and acoustic pianos, organs, mellotron, other keyboards
Léo Margarit - drums, backing vocals

Guest musicians
Jonas Reingold - bass guitar ("No Way")
Gustaf Hielm - bass guitar ("Innocence")
Mihai Anton Cucu - violin ("Sisters" and "Innocence")
Camilla Arvidsson - violin ("Sisters" and "Innocence")
Kristina Ekman - viola ("Sisters" and "Innocence")

References

External links
Official Pain of Salvation Website
Official Pain of Salvation Forum

Pain of Salvation albums
Concept albums
2010 albums
Inside Out Music albums